Paolo de Gratiis (died 1652) was a Roman Catholic prelate who served as Bishop of Ston (1635–1652).

On 9 July 1635, Paolo de Gratiis was appointed by Pope Urban VIII as Bishop of Ston. He served as Bishop of Ston until his death in 1652.

References 

1652 deaths
17th-century Roman Catholic bishops in Croatia
Bishops appointed by Pope Urban VIII